Birgit Havenstein (born 4 January 1954) is a German flautist and composer. She was born in Berlin, and studied music and music education at the Städtisches Konservatorium. At the 1988 Sommerliche Musiktage Hitzacker she won awards for her Graffiti for flute, cello and harp.

Selected works
Even the earth gave his secrets for violin, alto sax and piano, 1992
Music on an absent cellist for solo harp, 1993
Tempelglocken verstummen, Blütenduft bleibt for flute, clarinet, violin, viola, cello and piano
Graffiti for flute, cello and harp, 1988

References

1954 births
20th-century classical composers
German classical composers
German music educators
Living people
Women classical composers
20th-century German composers
Women music educators
20th-century women composers